Amangkurat IV was the son of Pakubuwono I, and Susuhunan Mataram between 1719 to 1726.

His son was the last ruler of Mataram, Pakubuwono II.

References
 Miksic, John N. (general ed.), et al. (2006)  Karaton Surakarta. A look into the court of Surakarta Hadiningrat, central Java (First published: 'By the will of His Serene Highness Paku Buwono XII'. Surakarta: Yayasan Pawiyatan Kabudayan Karaton Surakarta, 2004)  Marshall Cavendish Editions  Singapore  
 Ricklefs, M.C. (1998) The seen and unseen worlds in Java, 1726–49: History, literature and Islam in the court of Pakubuwana II. St. Leonards NSW: The Asian Studies Association of Australia in association with Allen and Unwin; Honolulu : The University of Hawai'i Press.

Sultans of Mataram
Burials at Imogiri
18th-century Indonesian people
Indonesian royalty